Inforpress - Capeverdean News Agency (Portuguese: Inforpress - Agência Cabo-verdiana de Notícias) is the official news agency of Cape Verde.  It is headquartered in the capital city of Praia.  Its current head is Jacqueline Elisa Barreto de Carvalho which she became in October 2017.

History
It was founded in 1988 as Cabopress, it changed to its current name in 1998.  Inforpress is the elemental name of "Informative Press"  It is sometimes known as the "Capeverdean News Agency" but that is not the official name.

It is one of the founding members of Aliança das Agências de Informação de Língua Portuguesa (ALP), Alliance of Portuguese-speaking News Agencies, formed in July 1996.

The building is located in Largo de Marconi in the neighborhood of Achada Santo António.

The agency offers news service in text, videos, sounds for radio, information relating to photographies.  Also, it provides services to all the organizations of social communications, national and international, inside and outside the country  Its news sources are published on line with a free access, but the information package that offers customers (texts and images) are available for subscription.   Its videos are used for TV that are edited or unedited.  The corporation have dedicated to provide specialized services for public and private companies, state and other institutions both national and international.  For Capeverdean and foreign companies.  Inforpress receives a generalist services about news related to politics, economics, society, sports, culture and environment.

Inforpress has its own television network known Inforpress-TV, a corporation which brings emergency services for television (Emergencia-TV), rarely done today.

In October 2014, it announced that the Capeverdean government planned to fund Inforpress a structure of Rádio Televisão Cabo-Verdiana with a preface of a merger up to June 2015   In September 2015, Capeverdean president Jorge Carlos Fonseca sanctioned a bill that merges the two companies for entry within 30 days to create a new entity, Radiotelevisão & Inforpress, Sociedade Anónima (RTCI - Broadcasting, Inforpress and Anonymous Society).

In June 2015, journalist Arminda Barros of Inforpress started a consensus between governments and opposition for the first president of the new entity of media regulation in Cape Verde, the Autoridade Reguladora da Comunicação Social (ARC), the Social Communications Regulator Authority.

See also
Aliança das Agências de Informação de Língua Portuguesa (ALP), Alliance of Portuguese-speaking News Agencies
Media of Cape Verde

References

Further reading
 José Vaz Furtado é o novo Administrador Único da Agência Cabo-Verdiana de Notícias - Inforpress S.A, desde 1 de setembro de 2021.https://inforpress.cv/governo-nomeia-jose-vaz-furtado-como-administrador-unico-da-inforpress/
Mestre em Políticas Públicas e Administração Local pela Universidade Jean Piaget de Cabo Verde, onde defendeu a sua dissertação: ‘Políticas Públicas e implementação do Cluster do mar/Economia Azul em Cabo Verde, o que lhe valeu um Diploma de Mérito de Melhor aluno de Mestrado | É doutorando em Território Risco e 
Políticas Públicas, na Universidade de Coimbra, 2018 | Licenciado em Jornalismo pela Escola Superior da Comunicação Social de Lisboa, desde 2003| Desde 2008, Técnico de Comunicação da Agência Reguladora Multissetorial da Economia (ARME).

Correia, José Mario. Da Cabopress à Inforpress SA 1988-2011, duas décadas de jornalismo: um novo começo... online (Cabopress and Inforpress S.A., 1988-2011, Two Decades of Journalism, a New Start). Lisboa: JM Edições, 2011.

External links
Official website, in Portuguese, English and French

News agencies based in Cape Verde
Mass media in Praia
1988 establishments in Cape Verde